The International Network of Universities (INU) is a global consortium of higher education institutions that actively seek international partnerships and experiences, create innovative programming and delivery methods, and embrace the internationalization movement. INU activities focus on:

 Advancing internationalization of member universities
 Preparing students for lives and careers as global citizens
 Engaging students and staff in international mobility programs
 Sharing experiences and best practices
 Delivering joint teaching and degrees
 Supporting early career researchers

New members can only be admitted according to INU criteria and procedures. Member universities are based in Argentina, Germany, Indonesia, Japan, South Africa, Spain, Sweden, United Kingdom and the United States of America.

Network Activities

Activities include:

Student Seminar and Master’s Summer School for Global Citizenship and Peace

International Student Conference on Global Citizenship

Henry Fong Award for Global Citizenship and Peace

International Internship Program

Administrative Staff Shadowing

Research Seed Money Fund

Researcher Mobility Program

Governance
The council is the supreme decision-making body for the network. However, for day-to-day running the council elects an executive committee which is aided by the secretariat.
The INU Constitution can be found here.

Council
The INU is governed by a council on which each network member has a seat. Each member is entitled to one vote per institution on proposals presented. Membership on the council is institutional. The council is chaired by the INU president. The presidency of the network is currently held by European University Viadrina (Germany). The council meets bi-annually, and meetings are hosted in rotation amongst the network members.

Secretariat
The administration and coordination of INU activities are handled by the INU secretariat. The secretariat is currently held at Kingston University London (United Kingdom).

Member universities

References

International college and university associations and consortia